Clifton Furnace is a historic cold blast charcoal furnace located near Clifton Forge, Alleghany County, Virginia. It was built in 1846 of large, rough-hewn, rectangular stones.  It measures 34 feet square at the base and the sides and face taper towards the top.  The furnace went out of blast in 1854 and revamped in 1874.  It was abandoned in 1877.

It was added to the National Register of Historic Places in 1982.

References

Industrial buildings and structures on the National Register of Historic Places in Virginia
Industrial buildings completed in 1846
Buildings and structures in Alleghany County, Virginia
National Register of Historic Places in Alleghany County, Virginia
Charcoal
Industrial furnaces